Love and Trumpets (German:Liebe und Trompetenblasen) may refer to:

 Love and Trumpets (1925 film), a German silent film
 Love and Trumpets (1954 film), a West German film